Armand Panigel (15 October 1920 in Bursa, Ottoman Empire – 28 December 1995 in Saint-Rémy-de-Provence aged 75) was a French musicologist and film critic. He was also a historical figure of French radio and television in the fields of classical music and cinema.

Early life
After studying at the French high school in Cairo, he studied law and mathematics at the University of Montpellier.

Career
He began his career as radio and film producer in Cairo from 1939 to 1944.

He became a well-known radio man in the 1950s. He created, produced and hosted on France Musique the flagship radio show  from 1946 to 1984 (in particular with Antoine Goléa, Jacques Bourgeois and Jean Roy), as well as other broadcasts.

From 1947 to 1964, he founded and directed the magazine Disques, a review of classical records. At the time, UNESCO commissioned him with indexing, with a view to publishing catalogues, all existing recordings of certain composers, starting with Bach, Beethoven and Chopin. In 1946, he became the founding vice-president of the Académie Charles-Cros.

He also pursued a career as a publisher, notably as director of series at Régie-Cassette-Vidéo, where he established la Mémoire du cinéma, and founding director of Rééditions d'enregistrements du domaine public (LPs) of classical music, dedicated to la Mémoire de la musique.

Panigel worked as Chairman and Chief Executive Officer of "Éditions et impressions de la Cinématographie française (1962–64)", président of the Commission d' du cinéma (1975–76), Member of the Board of Directors of the association des auteurs de films, Director of collections of classical music CDs (1993–95).

His career was rewarded with his promotion to the rank of officer of the Ordre des Arts et des Lettres.

He was the author of several reference books on music and cinema. In 1994, fascinated by new technologies, he began producing and directing CD-ROMs, "because it is a three-dimensional work, combining sound, image and text: it is the dream of my life," he declared to the AFP one year before his death.

Publications 
 Le Guide français du disque (Éd. de la Revue Disques, 1948)
 L'Œuvre de Frédéric Chopin (Éd. de la Revue Disques, Archives de la Musique enregistrée UNESCO, 1949)
 Catalogue général des disques microsillons (Éd. de la Revue Disques, 1958–64)
 Index de la cinématographie française (Éd. La Cinématographie française, 1964)
 Les Écrits de S. M. Eisenstein : le cinéma, son sens, sa forme on livres-cinema.info, (adaptation from Russian and American, 1975)

References

External links 
 Armand Panigel on Encyclopédie Larousse
 La tribune des critiques de disques. Armand Panigel, Antoine Goléa, Jacques Bourgeois... on YouTube
 Mort d'Armand Panigel on Libération (9 January 1996)
 Armand Panigel, le pionnier... et le projet 
 

20th-century French musicologists
French film historians
French television producers
French television directors
French radio presenters
French television presenters
French publishers (people)
Officiers of the Ordre des Arts et des Lettres
1920 births
People from Bursa
1995 deaths
French film critics
French expatriates in the Ottoman Empire
French expatriates in Egypt